Belo Corporation  was a Dallas-based media company that owned 20 commercial broadcasting television stations and three regional 24-hour cable news television channels.  The company was previously known as A. H. Belo Corporation after one of the early owners of the company, Alfred Horatio Belo, now the name of the newspaper company spun off from Belo early in 2008. Belo had its headquarters in the Belo Building in Downtown Dallas, designed by Dallas architects Omniplan and constructed between 1983 and 1985.

History

The company traces its roots back to the establishment of The Daily News in Galveston, Texas in 1842, four years before the Republic of Texas was annexed to the United States; the company sold The Daily News in 1923. In 1857, the company began publishing the Texas Almanac, a reference book focused on Texas, and on October 1, 1885, launched a second newspaper, The Dallas Morning News, based in Dallas, Texas.

On June 26, 1922, the company expanded into broadcasting with the sign-on of WFAA-AM (at that time, shared time with WBAP and WRR in Dallas, Texas).

In July 1926, A.H. Belo Corporation was founded when George Bannerman Dealey acquired a majority interest in the company.

On January 30, 1950, the company announced the purchase of DuMont-affiliated Dallas television station KBTV (renamed WFAA after the acquisition) for $575,000. This purchase, approved by the Federal Communications Commission (FCC) on March 13, 1950 and completed on March 17, marked the company's entry into television broadcasting. The station switched its primary affiliation to NBC after the acquisition and was also affiliated with ABC on a secondary basis.

In 1963, the company acquired News-Texan Inc., a publishing company that owned suburban newspapers in the Dallas–Fort Worth metroplex; this subsidiary was later renamed Dallas–Fort Worth Suburban Newspapers Inc.

The company acquired its second television station in 1969 when it purchased KFDM-TV in Beaumont from Beaumont Broadcasting, followed in 1980 by its purchase of WTVC in Chattanooga, Tennessee. Among its purchases in later years, Belo acquired the Corinthian Broadcasting subsidiary of Dun & Bradstreet in December 1983, adding six additional stations, including CBS affiliates KHOU in Houston and KOTV in Tulsa, Oklahoma and ABC affiliate WVEC-TV in Norfolk, Virginia to its portfolio. This forced the sales of KFDM and WTVC to Freedom Communications, and of WISH-TV in Indianapolis and WANE-TV in Fort Wayne, Indiana to LIN Broadcasting, to comply with FCC ownership limits.

On December 8, 1991, A.H. Belo acquired the Dallas Times-Herald for $55 million; the paper ceased operations the next day.

On September 26, 1996, A.H. Belo announced that it would acquire the Providence Journal Company (publishers of The Providence Journal in Providence, Rhode Island) for $1.5 billion. This purchase brought Belo the Providence company's ten television stations including KING-TV in Seattle.

On October 1, 2007, Belo announced the separation of its newspaper and television businesses by spinning off its newspaper business to shareholders as A. H. Belo Corporation, officially completed in February 2008. The television business retained the Belo Corporation name (without the "A. H." initials). The spin-off was structured so that the broadcasting company was the legal successor to the prior company.

In September 2010, Belo became the first non-ABC group to sign on with the Live Well Network, adding it to five of their stations (WFAA, KMOV, WCNC-TV, WVEC, & WWL-TV) on November 8, 2010.

On June 13, 2013, Gannett Company announced plans to buy Belo for $1.5 billion and the assumption of debt. Because of ownership conflicts in markets where both Belo and Gannett owned television stations and newspapers, Gannett planned to sell six Belo-owned stations—KMOV in St. Louis, WHAS-TV in Louisville, KMSB in Tucson, KGW in Portland, Oregon, and KTVK and KASW in Phoenix—to Sander Media, LLC, owned by former Belo executive Jack Sander. Gannett would have provided some services to the Sander stations under joint services agreements. Due to concerns about any possible future consolidation of operations of Gannett- and Belo-owned properties in markets where both owned television stations or collusion involving the Gannett and Sander stations in retransmission consent negotiations, anti-media-consolidation groups (such as Free Press) and pay television providers (such as Time Warner Cable and DirecTV) called for the FCC to block the acquisition.

The concerns were especially pronounced in St. Louis, since the merged company would have controlled two of the three news departments run by "Big Four" stations in that city—KMOV, which was to have been sold to Sander, and Gannett-owned KSDK. On December 16, 2013, the United States Department of Justice threatened to block the deal unless Gannett, Belo and Sander completely divested KMOV to a government-approved third-party company that would be barred from entering into any agreements with Gannett, in order to fully preserve competition in advertising sales with KSDK. Justice claimed that Gannett and Sander would be so closely aligned that Gannett would have dominated spot advertising in St. Louis. On December 20, the deal was approved by the FCC. With the completion of the deal on December 23, on the same day Gannett and Sander agreed to sell KMOV, KTVK, and control of KASW for $407.5 million to Meredith Corporation (which owns KPHO-TV in the Phoenix market); Sander served as caretaker owner of those stations during the sale process, and SagamoreHill Broadcasting would take on KASW's license. Meredith's purchase of KMOV was completed on February 28, 2014, and its purchase of KTVK, along with SagamoreHill's purchase of KASW, were completed on June 19. SagamoreHill was then forced to divest KASW to Nexstar Broadcasting Group (now Nexstar Media Group) on January 30, 2015.

On June 29, 2015, Gannett split into two companies, one specializing in print media and named "Gannett," and the other specializing in broadcast and digital media. The latter company, Tegna, retained most of the Belo stations and is the legal successor to the company that previously bore Gannett's name.

Former Belo-owned television stations
Stations are arranged in alphabetical order by state and city of license.

Notes:
 (**) - Indicates a station owned by Dun & Bradstreet subsidiary Corinthian Broadcasting prior to its acquisition by the original A. H. Belo Corporation in 1984.
 (++) - Indicates a station owned by The Providence Journal Company prior to its acquisition by the original A. H. Belo Corporation in 1997.
 (~~) - Indicates a station managed by Belo Corporation. Previously under ownership of HIC Broadcast, Inc.

Cable networks

Online presence
Belo operated websites for each of its properties.  The sites were formerly part of a separate company, known as Belo Interactive.  In late 2004, the company began the process of reintegrating the sites into sister media properties.  One of its most infamous investments was in the failed CueCat and its parent company, Digital Convergence.  Belo integrated its media properties to be able to use the device, but it never took off.

Belo also was one of the major investors in Classified Ventures, LLC.

In late 2009, Belo began transitioning the Web operations of its television stations from a largely in-house operation to the Broadcast Interactive Media platform. The first such relaunches were the Web sites of its Arizona station properties—KTVK/KASW in Phoenix and KMSB/KTTU in Tucson—which launched in September 2009. The transition (at least for the major Belo television properties) was completed on November 19, 2009 when WFAA in the Dallas–Fort Worth metroplex relaunched its Web site.

Infomercials
Belo used a modified infomercial form on many of its stations, branded Great Day (city) in several markets:
 WFAA-TV in Dallas, Texas uses the name Good Morning Texas to have some similarity to Good Morning America as WFAA is an ABC affiliate
  the NBC affiliate KGW in Portland, Oregon brands its program Greater Portland Today to have similarity with the Today'' show.

These programs remained in production following Belo's merger with the broadcasting unit of the Gannett Company (now known as TEGNA) in 2013.

References
Notes

Further reading

External links
 A.H. Belo Corporation at the Handbook of Texas Online

 
Tegna Inc.
Defunct broadcasting companies of the United States
Companies based in Dallas
Mass media companies established in 1926
2013 disestablishments in Texas
Mass media companies disestablished in 2013
Companies formerly listed on the New York Stock Exchange
1926 establishments in Texas
2013 mergers and acquisitions
Defunct companies based in Texas